Henry T. Laurency  was a Swedish anonymous esoteric teacher and expounder of Pythagorean hylozoics.

Laurency considered that the presentations of the esoteric knowledge which were made up to his time (by H. P. Blavatsky, C. W. Leadbeater, Annie Besant and Alice A. Bailey to mention the most prominent ones) were somewhat unsuitable for Westerners as their manner of presentation as well as their terminology and symbolism had more proximity to Eastern mentality. In his several books he therefore presents the esoteric knowledge using a modern, lucid terminology and mathematical nomenclature in order to render it more compatible to the Western mind.

List of works
Works of Henry T. Laurency completely translated into English:
The Philosopher's Stone
The Knowledge of Reality
The Way of Man
Knowledge of Life One
Knowledge of Life Two
Knowledge of Life Three
Knowledge of Life Four
Knowledge of Life Five

References 

1882 births
1971 deaths
Swedish occultists
20th-century Swedish philosophers